Presidential elections were held in Djibouti on 7 May 1993. They followed the constitutional changes approved in a referendum the previous year, which re-introduced multi-party democracy, and were the first presidential elections to feature more than one candidate. Nevertheless, incumbent President Hassan Gouled Aptidon of the People's Rally for Progress won, taking 60.7% of the vote, based on a 51.25 turnout.

Results

References

Djibouti
Presidential
Presidential elections in Djibouti
Djibouti